Chaukhtatgyi Buddha Temple is the most well-known Buddhist temple in Bahan Township, Yangon, Yangon Region, Myanmar. It houses one of the most revered reclining Buddha images in the country.

The construction was sponsored by a wealthy Burmese Buddhist, Sir Po Tha, in 1899. The image was completed in 1907 by another construction company, but was not proportioned correctly, and the Buddha's face had an aggressive expression.

In the 1950s, the old Buddha image was demolished and temple trustees began work to replace the image, under the supervision of U Thaung, a master craftsman from Tavoy (now Dawei). The Buddha image was consecrated in 1973.

Gallery

References

External links

Buddhist temples in Yangon